Emarateh Amiriyeh is an old building dating from the Qajar period. It is located on Saheli street, Persian Gulf park, Kooti district, Bushehr, Iran. It was listed as National works of Iran with record number 2319 on 9 May 1999.

Emarateh Amiriyeh is a two-storey building with a central courtyard. The front porch has eight columns and two doorways.

References

National works of Iran
Buildings of the Qajar period
Buildings and structures in Bushehr Province